Prior to colonisation in 1788, the Aboriginal Australians living in the areas now known as New South Wales spoke between 35 - 40 languages including between 70 - 100 dialects. Some of these languages are closely related, many are no longer spoken fluently and some are considered endangered or extinct by linguists but are described as "sleeping" by First Nations people. Aboriginal languages were not written down prior to contact with colonists, but for thousands of years the oral tradition passed down knowledge of country, astronomy, the environment, navigation, stories of creation and the seasons, the relationship and obligations First Nations people have to country and one another. Where word lists and written records were made after colonisation, they were often compiled by amateurs with no linguistic training, there are many variations of spelling and knowledge of the grammar of some languages may be limited without fluent speakers.

The New South Wales Aboriginal Languages Act 2017 became law on 24 October 2017. It is the first legislation in Australia to acknowledge the significance of First Languages.

The Aboriginal Language and Culture Nest project in NSW draws together communities with a common language to create opportunities to "revitalise, reclaim and maintain traditional languages". There are Aboriginal Language and Culture Nests that focus on the Bundjalung, Gamilaraay, Gumbaynggirr, Wiradjuri and Paakantji/Baarkintji languages. During the International Year of Indigenous Languages the issues of language loss and language revitalization projects were featured from the perspectives of First Nations people around NSW in a Living Language exhibition.

The Australian Institute of Aboriginal and Torres Strait Islander Studies (AIATSIS) maintain the AUSTLANG database of information from a number of sources about Aboriginal and Torres Strait Islander languages. The dataset listing the languages and synonyms is published under a Creative Commons Attribution 4.0 licence for reuse.

A-B

C-G

H-M

N-R

S-Z

See also
 Australian Aboriginal languages
 List of Australian Aboriginal languages

References

External links
 Rediscovering Indigenous Languages Project

 
Indigenous Australian languages in New South Wales